Make It Three is a 1938 British comedy film directed by David MacDonald and starring Hugh Wakefield, Edmund Willard and Diana Beaumont. The screenplay concerns a bank clerk who is left a very large inheritance on condition that he first serve three months in prison. It was the last film produced by Julius Hagen who had owned Twickenham Studios. The film was a quota quickie, made for release by MGM.

Cast
 Hugh Wakefield as Percy Higgin
 Edmund Willard as Big Ed
 Diana Beaumont as Annie
 Sydney Fairbrother as Aunt Aggie
 Jack Hobbs as Charlie
 Olive Sloane as Kate
 Alexander Field as Sam
 C. Denier Warren as Cackleberry

References

Bibliography
 Low, Rachael. Filmmaking in 1930s Britain. George Allen & Unwin, 1985.
 Wood, Linda. British Films, 1927-1939. British Film Institute, 1986.

External links

1938 films
1938 comedy films
Films directed by David MacDonald (director)
British comedy films
Quota quickies
Films shot at Twickenham Film Studios
British black-and-white films
1930s English-language films
1930s British films